Polina Andreevna Kostiukovich (born 7 March 2003) is a retired Russian pair skater. With her former skating partner, Dmitrii Ialin, she is the 2018 World Junior and the 2018–19 Junior Grand Prix Final silver medalist, and the 2019 World Junior bronze medalist. She is also the 2017 JGP Croatia and the 2018 JGP Austria champion.

Career

Early years 
Kostiukovich began learning to skate in 2009. She trained as a single skater until 2016.

Kostiukovich and Dmitrii Ialin began competing together in 2016. They were coached by Vasili Velikov in Saint Petersburg.

2017–2018 season: Silver at Junior Worlds 

Kostiukovich/Ialin made their international debut in late September 2017 at the Junior Grand Prix (JGP) competition in Zagreb, Croatia, where they won the gold medal. They beat the silver medalist, Gao Yumeng / Xie Zhong, by less than one point and the bronze medalist, their teammates Aleksandra Boikova / Dmitrii Kozlovskii, by about two points. At this competition Kostiukovich/Ialin performed a level 3 quad twist which is rarely seen even at senior competitions. They received 10.46 points for that twist.

In January 2018 Kostiukovich/Ialin won the bronze medal at the 2018 Russian Junior Championships after placing eleventh in the short program and second in the free skate.

In March 2018 Kostiukovich/Ialin competed at the 2018 Junior Worlds where they won the silver medal after placing second in the short program and third in the free skate. They were part of a Russian sweep of the pairs' podium, along with their training partners Anastasia Mishina / Aleksandr Galliamov (bronze) and Daria Pavliuchenko / Denis Khodykin (gold).

2018–2019 season: Bronze at Junior Worlds 

Kostiukovich/Ialin started their season by competing in the 2018 Junior Grand Prix series. At their first Junior Grand Prix event of the season they won the gold medal in Linz, Austria. They were ranked first in both the short program and the free skate and won the gold medal by a margin of more than 14 points over the silver medalist, their teammates Anastasia Poluianova / Dmitry Sopot. At their second JGP event of the season they won the silver medal in Ostrava, Czech Republic. They were ranked first in the short program and second in the free skate, and were beaten by the gold medalists, their teammates and training partners Kseniia Akhanteva / Valerii Kolesov by a margin of about 4 points. At this event they set the junior-level pairs' record for the short program (66.30 points). With these results they qualified for the 2018–19 Junior Grand Prix Final.

At the JGP Final, Kostiukovich/Ialin won the silver medal after placing first in the short program and second in the free skate. They were part of a Russian sweep of the pairs' podium. Kostiukovich/Ialin beat the bronze medalists, Apollinariia Panfilova / Dmitry Rylov, by about 3 points but the race for the gold medal were really tight. The gold medalists, their training partners Mishina/Galliamov, beat Kostiukovich/Ialin by a margin of only 1.1 point. At this event Kostiukovich/Ialin scored their personal best score of 189.53 points and they also upgraded their junior-level pairs' record for the short program (66.84 points).

At the 2019 Russian Championships, Kostiukovich/Ialin placed eighth in the senior event and second in the junior event, and were assigned to the 2019 World Junior Championships alongside Mishina/Galliamov and Panfilova/Rylov.  They won the short program at Junior Worlds, narrowly ahead of both of the other Russian teams, and were awarded a gold small medal for the result.  In the free skate, they had underrotations called on their combination jump and Kostiukovich fell on a throw triple Salchow.  As a result, they finished third in the free skate and third overall.  Ialin admitted "unfortunately, not everything worked out today."  Kostiukovich expressed the hope that "at our next Junior World Championships we can improve, fix our mistakes, and gain experience to be able to win."

2019–2020 season: Struggles and end of partnership with Ialin 
Kostiukovich/Ialin were initially assigned to the 2019 ISU JGP Croatia Cup in Zagreb, Croatia. However, they withdrew from the event due to puberty-related struggles faced by Kostiukovich. The team continued to compete domestically, qualifying for both the senior and junior-level Russian championships through the Russian Cup series.

Kostiukovich/Ialin placed eighth at 2020 Russian Championships in January, and later placed fifth at the junior championships in February, missing the podium for the first time in two seasons. On 13 March 2020, the pair announced the amicable end to their partnership. On 18 July 2020, Kostiukovich announced on Instagram that she had teamed up with Aleksei Briukhanov.

2020–21 season: Debut of Kostiukovich/Briukhanov 
Kostiukovich and her new partner, Aleksei Briukhanov, made their debut in Moscow at the second stage of the domestic Russian Cup series, the qualifying competition series to the 2021 senior and junior Russian Championships.  They placed fourth at the 2021 Russian Junior Championships. In April, Kostiukovich and Briukhanov parted ways with their longtime coaches Ludmila Velikova, Nikolai Velikov, and Vasili Velkikov to move to the camp of Vladislav Zhovnirski and Arina Ushakova in Moscow.

2021–22 season 
With the resumption of international junior competition following the COVID-19 pandemic prompting the cancellation of the 2020–21 international junior season, Kostiukovich/Briukhanov made their debut on the Junior Grand Prix at the 2021 JGP Slovakia. They won the bronze medal.

Programs

With Briukhanov

With Ialin

Records and achievements 
(with Ialin)
 
 Set the junior-level pairs' record of the new +5 / -5 GOE (Grade of Execution) system for the short program (66.30 points) at the 2018 JGP Czech Republic.
 Upgraded their junior-level pairs' record for the short program (66.84 points) at the 2018–19 JGP Final.
 Upgraded their junior-level pairs' record for the short program (68.31 points) at the 2019 World Junior Championships. This record was later broken by Apollinariia Panfilova / Dmitry Rylov at the 2019 JGP Poland.

Competitive highlights 
JGP: Junior Grand Prix

With Briukhanov

With Ialin

Detailed results 
Small medals for short and free programs awarded only at ISU Championships.

With Briukhanov

With Ialin

References

External links 

 
 

! colspan="3" style="border-top: 5px solid #78FF78;" |World Junior Record Holders

2003 births
Russian female pair skaters
World Junior Figure Skating Championships medalists
Living people
Figure skaters from Saint Petersburg